Brahmayu ( Sanskrit: ब्रह्मायु ) was a Maithil Brahmin scholar and a natural philosopher in the ancient Mithila during the period of Gautam Buddha. According to Buddhism Scripture "Brahmayu Sutta", he was able to understand 32 marks of a great man. But unfortunately, there does not appear to be any clear connection to Vedic or Vedanta texts that would show this to be the case. More investigation is required to give evidence of the 32 marks as recorded as being sourced from Brahmanical or Vedic tradition. He was an eminent teacher of the Ancient Mithila University. He was master in three branches of the Vedas. He was well versed in cosmology. He also knew  philology and grammar.

His Life Stories 
Brahmayu was living in Mithila. He was teaching in Mithila Vedas, Cosmology, Philology, etymology, phonology and Grammar to his students at his ashram. He was one hundred and twenty years old when Gautam Buddha arrived and wandered in Mithila. His favourite student was Uttara. Uttara was also a Brahmin and mastered in Vedas and Cosmology. Both the teacher Brahmayu and the student Uttara were able to understand 32 marks of a great man as mentioned in the Vedas. When Gautam Buddha was wandering in Mithila with his five hundred followers and then Brahmayu came to know the same news. Then Brahmayu sent his student Uttara to Gautam Buddha for identifying the 32 marks of a great man in Gautam Buddha. Uttara went to Gautam Buddha at his place of residence in Mithila. The place of residence of Gautam Buddha in Mithila is known as "Makhadeva's Mango Grove" according to the Buddhism Scripture Brahmayu Sutta. Uttara identified the 32 marks of a great man in Gautam Buddha having some doubt in two marks. Then he informed his teacher Brahmayu the same. Then Brahmayu also went to Gautam Buddha and identified the 32 marks of a great man in Gautam Buddha. Due to his connection with Buddha, he is also known as Brahmin Buddhist.

Dialogues between Brahmayu and Gautam Buddha 
There is a conversation between the Brahmin scholar Brahmayu and Gautam Buddha in the Buddhism text "Brahmayu Sutta".

References 

Maithil Brahmin
Indian philosophers